Robert Hermann Raudner (1854–1915) was a German landscape and genre painter, and etcher.

Raudner was born 21 January 1854 at Nimkau in Silesia, the son to a telegraphist. He studied painting from October 1878 in the antique class—drawing after the antique—of the Royal Academy of Fine Arts in Munich; at his matriculation Raudner gave Benau near Sorau as his birthplace. His fellow Academy students were Gyula Benczúr, Alexander Strähuber, Johann Leonhard Raab and Ludwig von Löfftz. After study Raudner worked in the Munich municipality of Schleißheim, mainly on landscape painting and etching. He exhibited works in the Munich Glass Palace in 1897 and 1899.

Raudner died aged 60 on 14 January 1915 at Munich. A street at Schleißheim is named after him.

Bibliography 
Thieme, Ulrich; Becker, Felix; "Raudner, Robert" in Allgemeines Lexikon der Bildenden Künstler von der Antike bis zur Gegenwart,  Hans Vollmer (ed.), Ramsden–Rosa. E. A. Seemann, Leipzig (1934), Volume 28, p. 41 (in German).

References

External links

Artists from Munich
19th-century German painters
19th-century German male artists
20th-century German painters
20th-century German male artists
German male painters
1854 births
1915 deaths